Actions Semiconductor Co. Ltd. is a Chinese fabless semiconductor company founded in 2000 and headquartered in Zhuhai, Guangdong province. The company has about 600 employees and designs SoCs for tablets, digital audio players, photo viewers and related products.

Products
The following is a list of system-on-chips developed and marketed by Actions Semiconductor, mainly targeting tablets.

Adoption 

 
S1 MP3 players use chipsets designed by Actions.

In 2012, Actions Semiconductor produced the ATM7029 which is a quad-core ARM Cortex-A5-based SoC using Vivante Corporations GC1000 GPU. This SoC has been used in the Ainol NOVO10 Hero II tablet and other low end tablets.

For Q2 2014, Actions was reported to be fourth largest supplier of tablet processors to the Chinese market.

Legal cases 
At one point, Actions was sued by SigmaTel with SigmaTel prevailing.  The findings were that Actions infringed upon SigmaTel by directly copying the ASICs designed by SigmaTel, once a world leader in the MP3 ASIC market. SigmaTel later was sold to Freescale Semiconductor.

References

External links
 Actions Semiconductor company website 
 S1MP3 website - contains end-user guides and information about firmware for S1 MP3 Players

ARM architecture
Embedded microprocessors
System on a chip
Semiconductor companies of China
Fabless semiconductor companies
Companies based in Zhuhai
Chinese companies established in 2000
Companies formerly listed on the Nasdaq
Chinese brands